Wings of Fury is a scrolling shooter, with some combat flight simulator elements, written for the Apple II by Steve Waldo and released in 1987 by Broderbund. The player assumes the role of a pilot of an American F6F Hellcat plane aboard the USS Wasp in the Pacific during World War II. It was released in 1989 for the X68000 and in 1990 for Amstrad CPC, Commodore 64, Amiga, and MS-DOS compatible operating systems. A Game Boy Color version was published in 1999.

Gameplay
The game is a horizontally scrolling shooter set over a number of World War II missions. In each mission, the player must protect an aircraft carrier from attacks by Japanese planes. The goal is to defeat the Japanese by destroying enemy bunkers, turrets and barracks on a series of islands and killing enemy soldiers either with bombs or by machine gun. The weapons to complete these objectives, besides machine guns, are a limited number of bombs, rockets and torpedoes. On some missions, the player must also sink Japanese vessels, such as destroyers, battleships, and aircraft carriers. The player has a finite amount of fuel and munitions, which can be replenished by returning to the carrier. The player's aircraft can be destroyed by accumulated damage from enemy fire or by crashing into the terrain.

The combatants are reversed for the Japanese Sharp X86000 home computer version released by Broderbund Japan. The player's airplane is Japanese and the enemies are Americans.

Reception
Computer Gaming World stated that the game had "some of the best action graphics pulled out of the Apple in recent memory", and concluded that Wings of Fury was "an exciting, memorable game for anyone remotely interested in action games". The game received 4 out of 5 stars in Dragon.

Reviews
Zero (Oct, 1990)
Raze (Dec, 1990)
Amiga Format (Nov, 1990)
Commodore User (Feb, 1990)
Tilt (Mar, 1990)
Zzap! (Nov, 1990)
Commodore Format (Nov, 1990)
Power Play (Nov, 1990)
Computer and Video Games (May, 2000)
Amiga Power (May, 1991)
Amiga World (Nov, 1990)
Amiga Computing (Dec, 1990)

References

External links
Manual at apple2.org

1987 video games
Amiga games
Amstrad CPC games
Apple II games
Broderbund games
Commodore 64 games
DOS games
Game Boy Color games
NEC PC-9801 games
Pacific War video games
Horizontally scrolling shooters
X68000 games
Video games developed in the United States
Video games scored by Tommy Tallarico
Aircraft carriers in fiction